XHVC-FM is a radio station on 102.1 FM in Puebla, Puebla. Broadcasting from the Azteca tower in Colonia La Paz, XHVC-FM is owned by Vértice 102 and carries a tropical format known as La Tropical Caliente.

History

XHVC received its first concession on December 21, 1978. It was owned by Vicente Capillo Rocha and originally broadcast on 90.9 MHz.

From 1986 to 2001, it was operated by Cinco Radio. It was also owned by Grupo ACIR at some point.

References

Radio stations in Puebla
Radio stations established in 1982
1982 establishments in Mexico